Computer conferencing may refer to:

Teleconference supported by one or more computers
Web conferencing
Data conferencing
Distributed computer applications:
Instant messaging
Online chat